Franceia is a genus of green algae belonging to the family Oocystaceae.

The genus was first described by Ernst Lemmermann in 1898.

The genus name of Franceia is in honour of Raoul Heinrich Francé (1874-1943), who was an Austro-Hungarian botanist, microbiologist as well as a natural and cultural philosopher and popularizer of science.

The genus has cosmopolitan distribution.

Species:
 Franceia armata
 Franceia droescheri

References

Oocystaceae
Trebouxiophyceae genera
Trebouxiophyceae